Testees is a Canadian television series, created by Kenny Hotz and written and produced by Kenny Hotz and Derek Harvie. Testees originally aired on Thursdays at 10:30 PM EST on FX and ran from October 9, 2008, to January 1, 2009 and debuted on October 14, 2008, on Showcase in Canada. The show is filmed in Toronto and Hamilton, Ontario. After one season, Testees was not renewed by FX.

Premise
The series follows two friends (Steve Markle and Jeff Kassel) as they work as human test subjects at Testico, a product testing Facility.  Besides being an obvious play on testes – including the descended double "e" in its logo – the show's title plays up the Vulnerability of test subjects, which is the source of much of the humor in the series.

Episodes

Home releases
Paradox Entertainment released the entire series on DVD in Region 1 (Canada only) on February 22, 2011.

On April 26, 2011, Entertainment One released the entire series on DVD in the US.

References

External links

 Official section of show creator's website
 
 Testees Pilot on Kenny Hotz's Official channel

2008 Canadian television series debuts
2008 Canadian television series endings
Showcase (Canadian TV channel) original programming
FX Networks original programming
2000s Canadian sitcoms
2000s Canadian workplace comedy television series
Television series by Entertainment One